Chenggong Township or Chengkung Township() is an urban township in Taitung County, Taiwan. It is a coastal town facing the Pacific Ocean. Chenggong Fish Harbor is just west of downtown.

History
Chenggong was originally an Amis settlement from which came the Hokkien name Moalaulau. After 1945, to avoid confusion with Singang Township of Chiayi County and to distinguish it from Tainan's Sinckan (now called Sinshih), it was changed to Chenggong, which commemorates the eponymous general Koxinga (Cheng Ch'eng-kung) who expelled the Dutch from Taiwan.

Geography
The township has 13,193 inhabitants and its total area is 144.9938 km².

Climate
Along with the most of the rest of Taitung County, Chenggong has a tropical monsoon climate.

Administrative divisions
 Bo'ai Village 博愛村
 Heping Village 和平村
 Sanmin Village 三民村
 Sanxian Village 三仙村
 Xinyi Village 信義村
 Zhongren Village 忠仁村
 Zhongxiao Village 忠孝村
 Zhongzhi Village 忠智村

Demographics
The majority inhabitants of the township are the Amis people which makes up to 53% of the population.

Notable people
 Teruo Nakamura (1919-1979, Attun Palalin or Lee Guang-Hui) last known Japanese hold-out to surrender after the end of hostilities in 1945

Economy
 Agriculture
 Fisheries
 Forestry

Tourist attractions

 Amis Folk Center
 Chengkung Aquarium
 Chengkuankao Cultural Landscape
 Chengkuankao Matsu Temple
 Chong-an Waterfall
 East Coast National Scenic Area
 Jiaping Beach
 Old Donghe Bridge
 Oceanarium
 Sanxiantai
 Shihyusan (Awana, or the Stone Umbrella)
 Siaoma Tunnel
 Singang Harbor
 Singang Waterfall
 Taitung County Museum of Natural History
 Taitung Museum of Marine Biology and Aquarium

Transportation
 Provincial Highway No.11
 Chenggong Fish Harbor
 Singang Port

References

Townships in Taitung County